My Jun, My Style is the first single album by Lee Joon-gi. He released his mini album My Jun, My Style on April 26, 2007 which contains three ballads, which he wrote primarily for his fans at the Episode 1 fan meeting on May 21, 2006. In addition, this release comes with a DVD containing special footage of Lee's visits around Asia and behind-the-scenes footage. The photo album offers a first look at Lee's highly anticipated upcoming film Virgin Snow, which co-stars Japanese actress Aoi Miyazaki.

A poll by a music website Jukeon that asked "Who will be the most popular if they release an album?" Lee ended up being in first place with 66% of the votes.

My Jun Collection
The My Jun Collection which was released August 16, 2006 comes with such essential gifts as a special Jun Ki standing base figure as well as special USB kit accessory. The set's 256 MB USB allows fans to access 3 special songs including the principal track's MV plus exclusive making of and photo material. Also included in this edition is the "My Jun" manual.

Track listing
 One Word (한마디만)
 Don’t Know Love (사랑을 몰라)
 Foolish Love (바보사랑)

References

2007 debut singles
2007 songs